Vehey Vaarey Therein is a 2003 Maldivian romantic film co-produced and directed by Abdul Faththaah. Produced by Fatthah and Shiham Rasheed under Motion Pictures, the film stars Yoosuf Shafeeu, Jamsheedha Ahmed, Mohamed Shavin, Khadheeja Ibrahim Didi and Amira Ismail in pivotal roles.

Premise
Liusha (Jamsheedha Ahmed) an innocent young woman suffering sexual abuse from her guardian agreed to marry Azim (Yoosuf Shafeeu) a negligent and short tempered man whom she met at a party of a mutual friend's. Brainwashed by Azim's friends as wives are a liability, he shows impolite behavior to his wife and continues an affair with his ex-lover, Aminath Nathasha (Khadheeja Ibrahim Didi) who hints that she will marry him, only if Azim and Liusha's relationship breaks on the latter's culpability. Liusha gets pregnant, distressing Azim and Nathasha. Months later, Nathasha leaves to Sri Lanka and Liusha gives birth to a boy which ultimately resulted Azim repenting himself and spending more time with his baby and wife. Nathasha returns from Lanka and was displeased to know Azim has created a boundary within them. She then uses black magic to pull Azim closer back to her.

Cast 
 Yoosuf Shafeeu as Azim
 Jamsheedha Ahmed as Liusha
 Mohamed Shavin as Mohamed Ziyan
 Khadheeja Ibrahim Didi as Aminath Nathasha
 Amira Ismail as Nareema
 Aminath Rasheedha as Azim's mother
 Koyya Hassan Manik as Asim
 Fauziyya Hassan as Ziyan's mother
 Ahmed Saeed as Nafil
 Ahmed Shah as Azim's friend (Special appearance)
 Mohamed Faisal as Azim's friend (Special appearance)
 Waleedha Waleed (Special appearance in the song "Hama Nidhi Nunidheyney")
 Sithi Fulhu as a sorcerer (Special appearance)
 Ahmed Asim as Nathasha's boyfriend (Special appearance)

Soundtrack

Accolades

References

2003 films
2000s romance films
Maldivian romance films